JConsole is a graphical monitoring tool to monitor Java Virtual Machine (JVM) and Java applications both on a local or remote machine.

JConsole uses underlying features of Java Virtual Machine to provide information on performance and resource consumption of applications running on the Java platform using Java Management Extensions (JMX) technology. JConsole comes as part of Java Development Kit (JDK) and the graphical console can be started using "jconsole" command.

See also 
 Java Management Extensions 
 Java Development Kit

External links 
 Using JConsole Oracle's article on using JConsole.
 Java SE Monitoring and Management Guide A technical guide.
 Monitoring and Management for the Java Platform JMX and JConsole in Sun Developer Network. 
 JConsole command manual. Command usage and options.
 jvmtop JConsole-like open source monitoring tool (but terminal based).

Java APIs
Management Extensions
Management Extensions
Network management